The Mittag-Leffler distributions are two families of probability distributions on the half-line . Both are defined with the Mittag-Leffler function, named after Gösta Mittag-Leffler.

The Mittag-Leffler function

For any complex  whose real part is positive, the series

defines an entire function.

First family of Mittag-Leffler distributions

The first family of Mittag-Leffler distributions is defined by a relation between the Mittag-Leffler function and their cumulative distribution functions.

Hence, the function  is the cumulative distribution function of a probability measure on the non-negative real numbers. The distribution thus defined, and any of its multiples, is called a Mittag-Leffler distribution of order .

All these probability distributions are absolutely continuous. Since  is the exponential function, the Mittag-Leffler distribution of order  is an exponential distribution. Their Laplace transform is given by:

In addition, these distributions are geometric stable distributions. Parameter estimation procedures  can be found here.

Second family of Mittag-Leffler distributions

The second family of Mittag-Leffler distributions is defined by a relation between the Mittag-Leffler function and their moment-generating functions.

For all , a random variable  is said to follow a Mittag-Leffler distribution of order  if, for some constant ,

where the convergence stands for all  in the complex plane if , and all  in a disc of radius  if .

A Mittag-Leffler distribution of order  is an exponential distribution. A Mittag-Leffler distribution of order  is the distribution of the absolute value of a normal distribution random variable. A Mittag-Leffler distribution of order  is a degenerate distribution. In opposition to the first family of Mittag-Leffler distribution, these distributions are not heavy-tailed.

These distributions are commonly found in relation with the local time of Markov processes.

References

Continuous distributions
Geometric stable distributions
Probability distributions with non-finite variance